Keeneyville is an unincorporated community in DuPage County, Illinois, United States. Keeneyville is located in Bloomingdale Township, along the southern borders of Hanover Park and Roselle on Gary Avenue, just south of Lake Street (U.S. Route 20).

Keeneyville is named after Albert Keeney, an early settler and pioneer developer.

Keeneyville School District 20 is the area elementary school district.

References

Unincorporated communities in DuPage County, Illinois
Unincorporated communities in Illinois